Palacio Municipal may refer to:

Places

City government headquarters 
 Palacio Municipal de la Ciudad de Buenos Aires in Argentina
 Palacio Municipal de Caracas in Venezuela
 Palacio Municipal (Castellón) in Spain
 Palacio Municipal in Chihuahua

 Palacio Municipal in San Miguel de Cozumel, Cozumel Municipality, Mexico
 Palacio Municipal de Guadalajara in Mexico
 Palacio Municipal de Guayaquil in Ecuador
 Palacio Municipal de Junín in Argentina
 Palacio Municipal de La Plata in Argentina
 Palacio Municipal de Lima in Peru
 Palacio Municipal (Montevideo) in Uruguay
 Palacio Municipal de Naucalpan in Mexico
 Palacio Municipal (Plasencia) in Spain
 Palacio Municipal de Puebla in Mexico
 Palacio Municipal de Tijuana in Mexico
 Palacio Municipal de Mérida in Mexico

Municipal congress centers 
 Palacio Municipal de Congresos, in Madrid, Spain

Municipal sport installations 
 Palacio Municipal de Deportes de Granada in Granada, Spain
 Palacio de los Deportes de León in León, Spain

See also 
 Palacio Municipal (Mexibús), a BRT station in Nezahualcóyotl, Mexico